Mount Zion Missionary Baptist Church is a historic African-American church at 305 W. Maple Street in Fayetteville, Tennessee.

Mt. Zion Church was organized in 1873 by former slaves and sons of slaves. The land for the church building was purchased that same year.

The current church building was built in 1902 after an earlier building was destroyed by fire. It is a two-story brick and stone building of Gothic Revival design. It was the site of Lincoln County organizational meetings for the NAACP.

The church building was added to the National Register of Historic Places in 2000.

References

External links
 Mt. Zion Missionary Baptist Church website

Baptist churches in Tennessee
Churches on the National Register of Historic Places in Tennessee
Buildings and structures in Lincoln County, Tennessee
National Register of Historic Places in Lincoln County, Tennessee